Jawaharlal Nehru Medical College and Hospital, Bhagalpur is a government recognized medical college and hospital in Bhagalpur, Bihar, India.

It has an approx area of  209 acres with total constructed area of 1,00,000 (in sq mtr.) approx. It is approved by the Medical Council of India and is affiliated to Aryabhatta Knowledge University, Patna.

About college
Established in 1971 by the Government of Bihar. Since 2010, it is affiliated to Aryabhatta Knowledge University, Patna, while it was previously affiliated to Tilka Manjhi Bhagalpur University. One hundred students enroll in the MBBS course each year.

18 seats are filled through All India Quota of NEET(UG) and the remaining 102 seats are filled through the state Quota of NEET (UG). The hospital is situated in Mayaganj where the clinical departments are running. Administrative Block, Anatomy Physiology, Biochemistry, Pathology, Pharmacology, PSM, FMT, and the Microbiology department are situated in historical Naulakha Kothi.

See also

References

External links
 Official website
Aryabhatta Knowledge University

Medical colleges in Bihar
Monuments and memorials to Jawaharlal Nehru
Education in Bhagalpur district
Universities and colleges in Bhagalpur
Educational institutions established in 1971
1971 establishments in Bihar
Hospitals in Bihar
Colleges affiliated to Aryabhatta Knowledge University